Frederick of Nassau, Lord of Zuylestein (1624–1672) was an illegitimate son of Frederick Henry, Prince of Orange, by Margaretha Catharina Bruyns,

Life

Frederick was born in 1624 out of wedlock to Frederick Henry, Prince of Orange (1584 – 1647) and Margaretha Catharina Bruyns (1595–1625), who was the daughter of Ludolph Bruyns, mayor of Emmerich.

On 15 March 1640, Frederick's father gave him Castle Zuylestein (also spelled Zuylenstein) - situated about twenty miles east of the city of Utrecht, and with it he also gave him the title Lord of Zuylestein (in Dutch: Heer van Zuylestein). Furthermore, he made Frederick captain of infantry for the state. 
In 1659, Frederick was made governor of the household of his nephew, William III of Orange. Through lobbying by Johan de Wit, William III became the state's ward in 1666, and Frederick was dismissed. His dismissal was because he was married to an Englishwoman and was under suspicion of pro-English leanings. In April 1672 (the rampjaar) he became general of the infantry and in August he became involved in the murders of Johan and Cornelis de Wit.

Marriage and children
On 16 October 1648, Frederick married Mary Killigrew (born 1627) in The Hague. She was a daughter of William Killigrew (1606–1695) (a favourite of Charles I and Charles II of England) and Mary Hill, of Honilay. She was a first cousin of Charles II's illegitimate daughter, the Countess of Yarmouth. She had moved to the Netherlands in February 1644, aged barely seventeen, as a maid of honour to Mary, Princess Royal and Princess of Orange.

Frederick and Mary had three children:
Willem Hendrik van Nassau-Zuylestein, 1st Earl of Rochford, Heer van Zuylestein, Leersum en Waayenstein (1649 – 12 July 1708). He was born at Castle Zuylestein. He became a soldier and diplomat and was a close confidant of his cousin, William III of England, who rewarded him with the titles Earl of Rochford, Viscount Tunbridge and Baron Enfield in 1695.
Hendrik van Nassau-Zuylestein, Heer van Leersum (ca 1650 – 13 November 1673). He died in the siege of Bonn when the troops of the Republic, under the leadership of his cousin William III, conquered Bonn, which resulted in the French supply lines to the troops in the Republic being cut off.
 Maria van Nassauw, (1656-?)

Death
In October 1672 Frederick died near Woerden in a battle with the French known as the Battle of Kruipin.

Half-siblings

Frederick was an illegitimate son of Frederick Henry, Prince of Orange, born to him before he married. Frederick had nine legitimate half-siblings with whom he shared his father. Their mother was his father's wife Amalia of Solms-Braunfels.
William II, Prince of Orange (27 May 16266 November 1650)
 Luise Henriette of Nassau (27 December 162718 June 1667)
 Henriëtte Amalia of Nassau (26 October 1628December 1628)
 Elisabeth of Nassau (4 August 1630)
 Isabella Charlotte of Nassau (22 January/28 April 163217 May 1642)
 Albertine Agnes of Nassau (9 April 163424 May 1696)
 Henriette Catherine of Nassau (10 February 16373 November 1708)
 Hendrik Lodewijk of Nassau (30 November 163919 December 1639)
 Maria of Nassau (5 September 164217/20 March 1688)

Arms
Frederick used the arms below.

Descendants

Literature
 Herbert H. Rowen, The princes of Orange: the stadholders in the Dutch Republic. Cambridge and New York: Cambridge University Press, 1988.
 Herbert H. Rowen, The princes of Orange: the stadholders in the Dutch Republic. Cambridge and New York: Cambridge University Press, 2003.
 Petrus Johannes Blok, "History of the people of the Netherlands". New York:  G. P. Putnam's sons, 1898.
 Jonathan I. Israel, "The Dutch Republic: Its Rise, Greatness, and Fall, 1477–1806" Oxford University Press, 1995.

References

1624 births
1672 deaths
Frederick
People from Leersum 
People from Utrechtse Heuvelrug
Sons of monarchs